The Kinleith Mill is a pulp and paper plant located at Kinleith, Tokoroa, New Zealand. It is one of eight mills operating in the New Zealand pulp and paper industry. It is currently operated by Oji Fibre Solutions, formerly Carter Holt Harvey

Kinleith Mill has a production of approximately 330,000 tonnes of paper grades per year, plus 265,000 tonnes of predominantly bleached pulp. The site boasts its own cogeneration plant operated by Genesis Energy, which burns wood waste and generates approximately 40 MW used mainly on-site, with the rest of the required electricity mainly coming via a 110 kV transmission line direct from the nearby Arapuni Dam. The mill is Tokoroa’s largest employer, with some 450 employees and 280 additional subcontractors, mainly from ABB. A cycleway path runs between the mill and Tokoroa township.

Kinleith was established as a sawmill community and dedicated timber forests serving it were planted from 1924 on, with a heavy duty railway reaching the facility in 1952 (Kinleith Branch line), and the mill itself commencing production in 1953. Tokoroa was at that time mainly a service/dormitory town to the mill facilities. Kinleith was built by New Zealand Forest Products and named for the Kinleith paper mills, on the Water of Leith, Scotland by Sir David Henry KBE, who worked there during his papermaking apprenticeship.

See also

List of paper mills

References

External links 
Official website

Pulp and paper mills in New Zealand
Industrial buildings in New Zealand
Buildings and structures in Waikato
Tokoroa